Odom is a surname originating from England.

Notable people with the surname include:
 Andrew Odom (1936–1991), American blues singer and songwriter
 Antwan Odom (born 1981), American football player
 Barry Odom (born 1976), American football coach
 Bob Odom (born 1935), former Louisiana Commissioner of Agriculture and Forestry
 Carmen Hooker Odom, former state government agency head
 Christopher C. Odom (born 1970), movie director
 Chris Odom (born 1994), American football player
 Cliff Odom, American football player
 Dave Odom (born 1942), American basketball coach
 Duncan Odom, cancer genetics researcher at the University of Cambridge
 Elzie Odom (born 1929), American politician
 Frederick M. Odom (c. 1871–1960), Justice of the Louisiana Supreme Court
 Gary Odom, Tennessee politician
 George Odom (disambiguation)
 Heinie Odom (1900–1970), American baseball player
 Jason Odom (born 1974), American football player
 Joe Odom (attorney) (1948–1991), American attorney-turned-musician
 Joe Odom (born 1979), American football player
 John C. Odom (1982-2008), American baseball player
 Johnny Lee "Blue Moon" Odom (born 1945), American baseball player
 Joseph Odom (born 1992), American professional baseball catcher
 Lamar Odom (born 1979), American basketball player
 Leslie Odom Jr. (born 1981), American actor
 Lometa Odom (1933–2017), American basketball player and coach
 Mary H. Odom (1921–2014), American politician and educator
 Mel Odom (disambiguation)
 Sammy Joe Odom, American football player
 Steve Odom (born 1952), American football player
 Susan Odom (1980-2021), American chemistry professor
 Tyler Odom, rock guitarist
 Vernon Odom, Sr. (1921–1996), American civil rights leader
 Vernon Odom (born 1948), American journalist
 William Odom (1932–2008), former director of the U.S. National Security Agency

References

See also
 Odom's indicator, a piece of anesthetic equipment
 Odum (disambiguation)